"The Little Things" is the third single from Colbie Caillat's 2007 debut album, Coco. It is a pop, folk-pop, acoustic song written by Caillat and Jason Reeves. The single did not chart well in the US, and was her weakest charting single from her album Coco. In 2008, she recorded a French translated version of this song.

Composition
According to the sheet music published at musicnotes.com, "The Little Things" is composed in the key of G major (recorded a half step lower in G-flat major).

Track listing
US single
 "The Little Things" (Radio Edit) (C. Caillat, J. Reeves) - 3:35
 "Magic" (Piano Version) (C. Caillat, J. Reeves) - 3:20

Dutch and German CD single
 "The Little Things" (Album version) (C. Caillat, J. Reeves) 3:46
 "Circles" (C. Caillat) - 3:54

German Maxi single
 "The Little Things" (Album version) 3:46
 "Dreams Collide" 4:05
 "Bubbly" (Napster Live Session) 3:35
 "The Little Things" (Music Video)

French iTunes single
 "Ces petits riens" (C. Caillat, J. Reeves) 3:46

The Radio Edit shortens the song's intro.

Charts

Music video

European version

The video features Colbie Caillat and her love interest towards a man, Troy Dudley, the same man who appears in all of Caillat's videos. The video was for the European market and was shot in San Francisco and is separate from the storyline of the other videos.

<div style="clear: left;">

U.S. version

Another music video for the song was shot in Hawaii according to the pictures on her MySpace page. The video is a prequel to "Bubbly" and features Troy Dudley, the same man who has appeared in all of her other videos. In the video, Caillat is shown riding on a bike in Kauai. She bikes past the house of the man she likes while on the way to work. She works at "Bubba Burgers" and ends up seeing him while she is at work. The video then moves to Caillat and her friends swimming at Black Pot beach in Hanalei Bay. The last segment shows her at a party, where she talks with him.

References

External links
Official site

2007 songs
2008 singles
Colbie Caillat songs
Songs written by Jason Reeves (songwriter)
Song recordings produced by Ken Caillat
Songs written by Colbie Caillat
Universal Republic Records singles